The Chiang Ching-kuo Memorial Song was written shortly after Republic of China President Chiang Ching-kuo died in 1988. The music composer was Chinese composer Hwang Yau-tai (Huang You-di) who also composed the "Chiang Kai-shek Memorial Song" in 1975. Chiang Ching-kuo was the son of the late President Chiang Kai-shek. Along with his father, Chiang Ching-kuo fled Mainland China to Taiwan in 1949 as the Chinese Communists took control of the Mainland.

See also
Chiang Kai-shek Memorial Song
Propaganda in the Republic of China

Chiang Ching-kuo
Chinese patriotic songs
Asian anthems
Cultural depictions of Chinese men
Songs about presidents